Eric Neville Geijer   (1894–1941) was a decorated Guards officer, royal herald, and genealogist. He was the second son of the Swedish diplomat Carl Emmanuel von Geijer and his English wife, Lila Lucy, née White (daughter of William Arthur White).

Educated at Wellington College and Trinity College, Cambridge. He was a cadet in the Wellington College Contingent of the Officer Training Corps. On 26 November 1914 he was naturalized as a subject of the United Kingdom, serving in the British Army during the First World War. Initially a second lieutenant in the Hampshire Regiment, from February 1917 he was attached to the Grenadier Guards, serving with distinction. Geijer was awarded the Military Cross in 1918, for leading a patrol that entered an enemy position under heavy machine-gun fire, and briefly attained the rank of acting captain.

On 19 October 1926 he was appointed to the College of Arms as Rouge Dragon Pursuivant.

In 1929 he became a Fellow of the Society of Antiquaries of London. He was a trustee of the Catholic Record Society.

Geijer married Ethel Trueman in 1933. He died on 14 January 1941. At the time of his death, his address was Little Bowstridge, Chalfont St Giles, Buckinghamshire. He was described as a captain in the Intelligence Corps when he was buried at Brookwood Cemetery

Publications
The Parish Register of Woodsford, Co. Dorset. Baptisms 1678–1812. Marriages 1696–1826. Burials 1678–1811. (Society of Genealogists, Transcripts of Parish Registers, 1939).

Notes

External links
Eric Geijer at the National Portrait Gallery (London).

References

1894 births
1941 deaths
English officers of arms
English genealogists
British people of Swedish descent
Grenadier Guards officers
People educated at Wellington College, Berkshire
Recipients of the Military Cross
Fellows of the Society of Antiquaries of London
British Army personnel of World War I
Burials at Brookwood Cemetery
Intelligence Corps officers
Alumni of Trinity College, Cambridge
German emigrants to the United Kingdom
Eric Neville